Kronberger is a surname. Notable people with the surname include:

Carl Kronberger (1841–1921), Austrian painter
Hans Kronberger (disambiguation), multiple people
Lily Kronberger (1890–1974), Hungarian figure skater
Maximilian Kronberger (1888–1904), German poet
Petra Kronberger (born 1969), Austrian alpine skier